Héctor Granado Gómez (born 20 March 1987), sometimes known simply as Héctor, is a Spanish professional footballer who plays as a left back or a central defender.

Club career
Granado was born in Valladolid, Castile and León. In his country he never played in higher than Segunda División B, representing in that level Real Valladolid B, Deportivo de La Coruña B and CF Palencia. At the end of the 2011–12 season, he suffered relegation with the latter club.

On 1 June 2013, Hong Kong First Division League side Southern District RSA announced the signing of free agent Granado. He returned to Spain the following year after joining CD Palencia Balompié, being released in January 2017.

Club statistics

Remarks:
1It includes Segunda División promotion play-offs and Segunda División B promotion play-offs.
2It includes 2012–13 Hong Kong Season Play-offs.

References

External links

1987 births
Living people
Footballers from Valladolid
Spanish footballers
Association football defenders
Segunda División B players
Tercera División players
Real Valladolid Promesas players
Deportivo Fabril players
CF Palencia footballers
Hong Kong First Division League players
Southern District FC players
Spanish expatriate footballers
Expatriate footballers in Hong Kong